State Route 99 (SR 99) is a north–south state highway in the north-central portion of the U.S. state of Ohio. The highway's southern terminus is in the southern end of Willard at a T-intersection with U.S. Route 224 (US 224).

Route description
Along its way, SR 99 runs through the western half of Huron County and the southwestern portion of Erie County.  No segment of SR 99 is included within the National Highway System, a network of highways identified as being most important for the nation's economy, mobility and defense.

History
SR 99 was designated in 1923.  It was originally routed along its current alignment from its present southern terminus at US 224, at the time known as SR 17, to its junction with what is today the concurrency of US 20 and SR 18 in Monroeville, but in 1923 was a part of SR 2.

In 1937, the highway was extended north from Monroeville through its present northern terminus at SR 4, and then continuing northwest from there along Skadden Road, and north along Bardshar Road before coming to an end at its intersection with US 6 in the western end of Sandusky.  By 1966, SR 99 was shortened to its present routing when the portions of the highway along Skadden Road and Bardshar Road north of SR 4 were removed from the state highway system, and jurisdiction of these roadways was turned over to Erie County.

Major intersections

See also

References

External links

099
Transportation in Huron County, Ohio
Transportation in Erie County, Ohio